In the United States, socially disadvantaged farmers and ranchers, for the purposes of USDA outreach and assistance, are defined under the 1990 farm bill as members of a socially disadvantaged group, which is defined to mean those whose identity in a group has subjected them to racial or ethnic prejudice without regard to their individual identity. For the purposes of loan eligibility, section 355(e) of the Con Act, adds gender to the definition of a socially disadvantaged group. 

In 2021 the definition garnered renewed attention due to the American Rescue Plan.

References 

United States federal agriculture legislation